The Faculty of Humanities, Charles University is a faculty of Charles University in Prague, Czech Republic. Located in Libeň, Prague 8, the faculty has about 220 internal employers and 3250 students.

History
The Faculty of Humanities is the youngest faculty of Charles University. Founded as the Institute for Liberal Education in 1994, the faculty gained full academic autonomy in 2000.

The first dean of the faculty was the former Minister of Education Jan Sokol. Sokol ran for President of the Czech Republic in the 2003 election but lost to Václav Klaus. He was replaced in 2007 by Ladislav Benyovszky. The current acting dean is Marie Pětová.

In 2013, Czech President Miloš Zeman refused to approve the professorship of anthropologist Martin C. Putna at the faculty for Putna's involvement in Prague Gay Pride in 2011. After numerous protests from academic and broader circles, Zeman capitulated. Putna was appointed by the Minister of Education Petr Fiala in June 2013.

Academics
The faculty's main research and academic focus is the humanities and social and cultural anthropology, including ethnomusicology, continental philosophy, gender studies, contemporary history, intellectual history and oral history.

For undergraduates, the faculty offers a BA program in Liberal Arts and Humanities (Studium humanitní vzdělanosti). This program corresponds to the concept of liberal education. The student must achieve 60 (or 50) ECTS credits in each year; they can freely choose lectures, seminars, etc. from the offer of the FHS and other faculties of Charles University. In addition, during the course of study, each student must pass comprehensive exams in philosophy, history, sociology, psychology, economics and anthropology, translate a professional text from the chosen foreign language (English, German, or French) and defend a bachelor's thesis.

For master's students, the faculty offers MA programs in Anthropology, Deutsche und Französische Philosophie (taught in German), History of modern European culture, Semiotics, Gender studies, Historical sociology, Master Erasmus Mundus EuroPhilosophie (taught in German and French, joint degree with Autonomous University of Barcelona, University of Coimbra, Université catholique de Louvain, Université Toulouse 2 – Jean Jaurès, University of Memphis, Universidade Fédérale de Sao Carlos, and Bergische Universität Wuppertal), Oral history - contemporary history, Social and cultural ecology, etc.

For doctoral students, the faculty offers three- or four-year PhD programs in Applied ethics, Historical sociology, German and French philosophy (taught in German and French), General anthropology, Semiotics and philosophy of communication, Social Ecology, Europäische Kulturzeitgeschichte (taught in German), Civic society studies, etc.

Facilities

The IZV was located in the building of the Czech Academy of Sciences in Legerová street. At the same time as the faculty was founded in 2000, it moved to the new building of the Charles University in U Kříže 8, Jinonice, Prague 5, with two separate facilities, one in Hůrka district, Prague 13, and another at Máchova street 7, Prague 2. The faculty moved to a new building in Libeň, Prague 8 in 2020. The new building won a national architecture award in 2021.

Two research and educational institutions are operating within the Faculty of Humanities: the Research Center for Personality Development and Ethnicity, the Rehabilitation Institute for the Visually Impaired, and the Cabinet for Civic Democratic Education. Its three-floor library is located beneath the university building on Jan Palach Square by Staroměstská metro station.

Departments

Notable people
Jan Sokol
Ladislav Benyovszky
Martin C. Putna
Jaro Křivohlavý
Petr Vopěnka
Miloslav Petrusek
Bedřich Moldan

See also
 Faculty of Arts, Charles University
 Faculty of Mathematics and Physics, Charles University
 Hussite Theological Faculty, Charles University
 Faculty of Social Sciences, Charles University
 First Faculty of Medicine, Charles University

References

External links

Universities in the Czech Republic
Charles University
2000 establishments in the Czech Republic
Educational institutions established in 2000